The mixed tandem event at the 2018 World Singles Ninepin Bowling Classic Championships was held in Cluj-Napoca, Romania on 22–23 May 2018. The first round took place after ending of the sprint events. Rest part was played the next day.

The new world champions in mixed tandems became the Czechs Renáta Navrkalová and Jan Endršt. The silver medals went to Croatian Ana Jambrović and Hrvoje Marinović, while the bronzes were won by Austrians Ramona Lienbacher and Philipp Vsetecka, and Romanians Tilda Duka and Petruţ Ovidiu Mihălcioiu.

Results

Starting places 

The starting places have been allocated on the basis of each team's achievements during the previous championships.

Draw 

The tandems were drawn into bouts with the reservation that pair from the same country can not play in the first round against each other.

References

2018
Mixed tandem